The Lebanon women's national futsal team represents Lebanon in international women's futsal competitions. Nicknamed "the Lady Cedars", the team is controlled by the Lebanese Football Association (LFA).

While Lebanon has yet to participate in the Women's Futsal World Tournament and the AMF Futsal Women's World Cup, they have participated once at the AFC Women's Futsal Asian Cup, in 2018, and twice in the WAFF Women's Futsal Championship, where they came fourth in 2012.

Competitive record

Women's Futsal World Tournament

AMF Futsal Women's World Cup

AFC Women's Futsal Asian Cup

Asian Indoor and Martial Arts Games

WAFF Women's Futsal Championship

Players

Current squad
The following players were called up for the 2018 AFC Women's Futsal Championship.

Previous squads

AFC Women's Futsal Championship
2018 AFC Women's Futsal Championship squads

See also
Lebanon national futsal team

References

Asian women's national futsal teams
National
Women's football in Lebanon